Transnet SOC Ltd is a large South African rail, port and pipeline company, headquartered in the Carlton Centre in Johannesburg. It was formed as a limited company on 1 April 1990. A majority of the company's stock is owned by the Department of Public Enterprises, or DPE, of the South African government. The company was formed by restructuring into business units the operations of South African Railways and Harbours and other existing operations and products.

Business units
The business units of Transnet include:

 Transnet National Ports Authority (NPA) and Transnet Port Terminals (formerly SAPO) own and operate the country's main seaports
 Transnet Pipelines - principal operator of South Africa's fuel pipelines
 Transnet Freight Rail railway operator - freight service
 Transnet Engineering - rolling stock manufacturing and maintenance

The National Ports Authority provides port infrastructure and marine services at the eight commercial seaports in South Africa.
Transnet port terminals was established in 2000, when Transnet's then single port division, Portnet, was divided into operations and landlord businesses namely, SAPO (Transnet port terminals) and National Port Authority (TNPA). Since its setting up, Transnet port terminals has played a part in supporting the South African government's export-led growth strategy. Most Southern African import and export commodities are handled through South Africa's six largest ports: Richards Bay, Durban, Saldanha, Cape Town, Port Elizabeth and East London. In October 2009 the new deepwater Port of Ngqura was commissioned just 7 km outside of Port Elizabeth. Port Terminals not only handle these cargo but implement logistics management solutions for its container, bulk, break-bulk (multi-purpose) and car terminal operations.

Transnet Pipelines, formerly known as Petronet, the guardian of the country's pipeline assets and is currently servicing two key industries (fuel and gas) by transporting petroleum and gas products over changeable distances.

Transnet Freight Rail formerly known as Spoornet, is the biggest division of Transnet. It is a heavy haul freight rail company that specializes in the transportation of freight. It is the biggest outside United States and excluding India that is not a company but a Government Department.

Transnet Engineering is dedicated to in-service maintenance, repair, upgrade, conversion and manufacture of freight wagons, mainline and suburban coaches, diesel and electric locomotives as well as wheels, rotating machines, rolling stock equipment, castings auxiliary equipment and services.

History of development
Railways were first developed in the area surrounding Cape Town and later in Durban around the 1840s. The first line opened in Durban on 27 June 1860. The initial network was created to serve the agricultural production area between Cape Town and Wellington. The news that there were gold deposits in the Transvaal Republic moved the Cape Colony Government (supported by British Government) to link Kimberley as soon as possible by rail to Cape Town as part of the colonial dream.

In the Union of South Africa (31 May 1910 – 31 May 1961), consisting of the four earlier colonies: the Cape of Good Hope, Natal, Orange Free State and Transvaal; all railways in South Africa finally became unified as a state-owned railway system in 1910 when the Central South African Railways, the Cape Government Railways and the Natal Government Railways were all fused by an Act of Parliament (South Africa Act 1909). Thus was born the South African Railways and Harbours (SAR&H).

South African Transport Services 
On 31 May 1961 the Union became the Republic of South Africa. By 1981 government decided that the SAR&H should restructure itself along business lines in order to evolve from a state-owned corporation towards privatization. Later, when commercial aviation started, the South African Airways also became a part of this huge land, sea and air transport system. Integral to the process was a change in the name and image of the organization, which would reflect its new mission as a state business enterprise. In April 1981, the country's railway, harbour, road transport, aviation and pipeline operations became known as South African Transport Services (SATS). At the same time, the enterprise was restructured into units and divisions with strong emphasis placed on localized management.           
 The "Legal Succession to the South African Transport Services Act, 1989" transformed the South African Transport Services from a government department into a public company. On 1 April 1990, after 80 years of government and parliamentary control, SATS received company status.

New Company
On 1 April 1990, a new company representing a vast transportation network was born, and appropriately named TRANSNET. Transnet Limited is a public company of which the South African Government is the sole shareholder.

Transnet is currently made up of: 
 Transnet Freight Rail (formerly Spoornet)
 Transnet Engineering (formerly Transwerk)
 Transnet National Ports Authority (formerly the NPA)
 Transnet Port Terminals (formerly SAPO)
 Transnet Pipelines (formerly Petronet)

Recent news
In December 2013, Transnet appointed nine black-owned companies to supply it with fuel over the following five years in a $1.5 billion deal aimed at promoting the South African government's black economic empowerment drive.

On 17 March 2014, Transnet's CEO, Brian Molefe, announced contracts of R50 billion with four international manufacturing companies to build 1,064 locomotives (465 diesel and 599 electric). GE would supply 233 diesel locomotives, CNR 232 diesel locomotives, Bombardier Transportation 240 electric locomotives and CSR 359 electric locomotives. Of the total of 1,064 locomotives, 70 would be imported complete and the rest would be built locally by Transnet Engineering in Pretoria and Durban.

The alternators of the first two diesel locomotives delivered to Transnet by China's state-owned CRRC Corporation, posed serious problems soon after they arrived in South Africa last year, rendering the locomotives unable to operate. Transnet is now refusing to accept a further 18 locomotives that are waiting to be shipped to South Africa.

Transnet subsequently terminated its contracts with Brian Molefe and his successor Siyabonga Gama. A forensic report states Molefe misled the Transnet board into approving costs. Molefe and three others increased the locomotive deal by at least R16 billion to R54 billion. By late 2018, both were under criminal investigation. The organisation fired Gama in October 2018 on the basis that it required a trustworthy CEO. In June 2020 it was reported in the Daily Maverick that three senior executives (Nonkululeko Sishi, Lenny Moodley and Shulami Qalinge) implicated in facilitating state capture had been dismissed. On 27 May 2022, Gama, along with four other executives, was arrested by the National Prosecuting Authority on charges of corruption, fraud and money laundering, and granted bail ahead of another court hearing in July 2022.

On 22 July 2021, Transnet experienced "an act of cyberattack, security intrusion and sabotage," that caused it to declare force majeure at several key container terminals, including its Durban, Ngqura, Port Elizabeth and Cape Town harbors. The Durban port handles 60% of South African container traffic. As of 26 July most computer systems had been restored, but Transnet's investigation into the attack's severity continued.

Class action lawsuit by its pensioners
A group of 66,000 pensioners have instituted a civil claim to recover about US$6.5 billion they claim Transnet plundered from their pension funds. The group has accused Transnet of stripping the Transnet Pension Fund and Transnet Second Defined Benefit Fund of its assets and mismanaging them to such an extent that the funds were unable to meet their obligations to members. They have also accused Transnet of attempting to dissolve the pension fund. Increases to pensions have been limited to 2% for close to the past decade, reducing most of the pensioners to poverty.

Chief executive officers (CEO) through the years

See also
 South African Airways
 Metrorail
 Gautrain
 Passenger Rail Agency of South Africa
 North West Cultural Calabash
 2021 Transnet Cyberattack

References

 
Transport operators of South Africa
Government-owned companies of South Africa
Transport companies established in 1990
Government-owned transport companies
Rolling stock manufacturers of South Africa
South African brands
Vehicle manufacturing companies established in 1990
South African companies established in 1990